The mixed team compound competition at the 2019 European Games was held on 21 and 23 June 2019 at the Olympic Sports Complex in Minsk, Belarus.

18 archers promoted from the individual ranking round.

Ranking round

Elimination round

References

External links
Qualification round results
Bracket

Archery at the 2019 European Games